{{DISPLAYTITLE:C20H14N4}}
The molecular formula C20H14N4 (molar mass: 310.35 g/mol, exact mass: 310.1218 u) may refer to:

 Porphine, or porphin
 Nemertelline